Aymes is an English surname. Notable people with this name include:

 Adrian Aymes (born 1964), British cricketer
 Jean-Marc Aymes (born 1961), French musician
 Jérémy Aymes (born 1988), French footballer
 Julian Aymes (1917—1992), British director and producer
 Thiérry Aymes (born 1973), French gymnast

English-language surnames